Sniper: Ghost Warrior is a series of tactical shooter stealth video games that are developed and published by City Interactive.

Games

Sniper: Art of Victory (2008)

The first game of the series was released on 13 June 2008. The poor quality of the game led to negative reviews.

Sniper: Ghost Warrior (2010)

A sequel, titled Sniper: Ghost Warrior, was released on 29 June 2010 for Microsoft Windows, Xbox 360 and PlayStation 3.

Sniper: Ghost Warrior 2 (2013)

The third evolution of the series switched from Chrome Engine to CryEngine. It was released on 12 March 2013 for Microsoft Windows, PlayStation 3 and Xbox 360.

Sniper Ghost Warrior 3 (2017)

Sniper Ghost Warrior 3 was announced on 16 December 2014 and received its first gameplay during E3 2015. The game was aimed to have AAA production sale, and ultimately sold more than a million copies across Microsoft Windows, PlayStation 4 and Xbox One.

Sniper Ghost Warrior Contracts (2019)

CI Games announced Sniper Ghost Warrior Contracts in August 2018. It uses mission-based gameplay instead of the open-world format from the third installment. It was released on 22 November 2019.

Sniper Ghost Warrior Contracts 2 (2021)

Sniper Ghost Warrior Contracts 2 was released 4 June 2021 for Microsoft Windows, PlayStation 4, PlayStation 5, Xbox One and Xbox Series X/S.

Reception

Sales
In January 2021, CI Games CEO Marek Tyminski confirmed that the Sniper: Ghost Warrior franchise had sold over eleven million copies.

References

External links 
 

 
Stealth video games by series
Video game franchises introduced in 2008
CI Games games